Andre Agassi was the defending champion, but lost in semifinals to Brad Gilbert.

Darren Cahill won the title by defeating Gilbert 6–2, 3–6, 6–4 in the final.

Seeds

Draw

Finals

Top half

Bottom half

References

External links
 Official results archive (ATP)
 Official results archive (ITF)

Singles